Dennis Emmanuel Abiodun Bamidele Chijioke Adeniran (born 2 January 1999) is an English professional footballer who currently plays for EFL League One side Sheffield Wednesday.

Club career

Fulham
On 9 August 2016, Adeniran made his professional debut in a League Cup match against Leyton Orient scoring with a first half header sending Fulham on their way to a 3–2 win. He made his league debut for Fulham as a late substitute against Nottingham Forest on 27 September 2016.

Everton
On 31 August 2017, Adeniran made a transfer deadline day switch to Everton. It was announced that his contract wouldn't be extended at the end of the 2020-21 season.

Wycombe Wanderers (loan)
On 25 September 2020, he joined newly-promoted Championship side Wycombe Wanderers on a season-long loan deal.

Sheffield Wednesday
On 10 July 2021, he joined recently relegated EFL League One side Sheffield Wednesday.  He made his competitive debut on 1 August 2021, at home to Huddersfield Town, in a game which saw them lose 4-2 on penalties, with Adeniran scoring his. He scored his first Owls goal against Doncaster Rovers on 14th August 2021. He was awarded the fans player of the month for September 2021, after he featured in three of the four games and scored his second goal of the campaign in the 1-1 draw v Ipswich Town. On 29 January 2022, Adeniran ruled himself out for the rest of the season after an operation, which was confirmed by manager Darren Moore. The following season, he would win EFL Cup goal of the round for both the first and second round.

International career
Adeniran represented England under-17 at the 2016 U17 Euros.

Career statistics

Notes

Honours 
Everton U23s

 Premier League Cup: 2018–19

References

External links
Profile on Everton website
England profile at The FA

Living people
1999 births
English footballers
Association football midfielders
English Football League players
Footballers from Southwark
Black British sportsmen
Fulham F.C. players
Everton F.C. players
Wycombe Wanderers F.C. players
England youth international footballers
English people of Nigerian descent
Sheffield Wednesday F.C. players